Marianne Streifler (born 5 February 1951) is a former pair skater who represented West Germany. With Herbert Wiesinger, she is the 1967 Prague Skate silver medalist and a three-time West German national medalist. The pair placed 11th at the 1968 Winter Olympics in Grenoble and 6th at the 1969 European Championships in Garmisch-Partenkirchen.

During her competitive career, Streifler was a member of FREC in Frankfurt am Main. After retiring from competition, she spent four years skating for Holiday on Ice. She then coached in Lauterbach, Hesse before relocating in 2008 to Füssen, Bavaria.

Competitive highlights 
 With Wiesinger

References 

1951 births
Figure skaters at the 1968 Winter Olympics
German female pair skaters
Living people
Olympic figure skaters of Germany
Sportspeople from Frankfurt